Folk-Lore is the third studio album by the Irish Celtic metal band Cruachan released in 2002 on Hammerheart Records.

Track listing

Personnel
Keith Fay - lead and acoustic guitars, vocals, keyboards, bouzouki, mandolin, banjo, bodhrán, percussion
Karen Gilligan - vocals, percussion
Joe Farrell - drums, percussion
John Clohessy - bass, vocals (backing)
John O'Fathaigh - Irish flute, tin whistle, low whistle, recorder, cover art

Additional personnel
Shane MacGowan - vocals on "Spancill Hill" and "Ride On", producer
Louise Fay - spoken on "Ossian's Return"
Liz Keller - fiddle, violin
Diane O'Keefe - cello
Denis Buckley - producer, engineering
Marco Jeurissen - artwork, layout

Cruachan (band) albums
2002 albums